Gevork Grigoryevich Sarkisyan (born 5 November 1999) is a Russian football player of Armenian descent. He plays for FC Veles Moscow.

Club career
He made his debut in the Russian Football National League for FC Veles Moscow on 6 March 2022 in a game against FC Akron Tolyatti.

References

External links
 
 
 
 Profile by Russian Football National League

1999 births
Russian people of Armenian descent
Footballers from Moscow
Living people
Russian footballers
Association football forwards
FC Lokomotiv Moscow players
FC Znamya Truda Orekhovo-Zuyevo players
FC Veles Moscow players
Russian Second League players
Russian First League players